Sundry Creditors is a 1953 novel by the British writer Nigel Balchin. A Midlands engineering company is inherited from his elder brother by a ruthless businessmen who attempts to seize total control and alienates almost everybody he encounters.

References

Bibliography
 Clive James. At the Pillars of Hercules. Pan Macmillan, 2013.

1953 British novels
Novels by Nigel Balchin
William Collins, Sons books